Love Insurance is a lost 1919 American silent comedy film directed by Donald Crisp, produced by Famous Players-Lasky and distributed by Paramount Pictures. It is based on the novel of the same name by Earl Derr Biggers, Love Insurance.

Love Insurance was later remade in 1924 as The Reckless Age and in sound era in 1940 as One Night in the Tropics.

Plot
As described in a film magazine, Lord Allan Harrowby (Elliott), upon arriving in America to wed an heiress, goes to the New York office of Lloyd's of London and insures against the lady changing her mind. Dick Minot (Washburn), assistant manager of the office, is assigned to the task of preventing that occurrence. He meets Cynthia Meyrick (Wilson), the lady in question, but not knowing her identity falls in love with her. However, business is his first thought and when she decides that she does not love her fiancé and is about to break her engagement, he does all in his power to bring about the wedding. This involves defeating a stranger who claims to be the real Lord Harrowby, outwitting a customs official who seeks to arrest the nobleman for smuggling in a diamond necklace, the routing of a clever criminal who tries to steal the necklace, and effecting the dismissal of a young woman who threatens a suit for breach of promise. After all this is effected and the wedding about to proceed, Cynthia again changes her mind, but this time it is because of an act by Harrowby. By the terms of the policy, this releases the company, so Dick presents his own case to Cynthia, which she accepts and they elope.

Cast
Bryant Washburn as Dick Minot
Lois Wilson as Cynthia Meyrick
Theodore Roberts as Spencer Meyrick
Frances Raymond as Mary Meyrick
Frank Elliott as Allan Harrowby
Edwin Stevens as Martin Wall
Clarence Geldart as George Harrowby
A. Edward Sutherland as Jack Paddock
P. Dempsey Tabler as Hunt
Fred E. Wright as O'Malley
Edward Alexander as Jarvis
Wilton Taylor as Stacy
Fred Huntley as Jenkins
Willard Louis as Trimmer
Ethel Fleming as Gabrielle

References

External links

 
allmovie.com
Film still (University of Washington, Sayre collection)
Film stills at silenthollywood.com

1919 films
American silent feature films
Lost American films
Films based on American novels
Paramount Pictures films
Films directed by Donald Crisp
1919 comedy films
American black-and-white films
Films based on works by Earl Derr Biggers
Silent American comedy films
1919 lost films
Lost comedy films
1910s American films